The 1996 Kerala Legislative Assembly election was held in May 1996 to elect members to the Kerala State Assembly. Polls were held simultaneously in all 140 seats and resulted in a voter turnout of 71.16%.

LDF Chief Minister candidate and then Leader of opposition of out going assembly V. S. Achuthanandan lost from Mararikulam his sitting seat ..
It's the first and only incident in Kerala that any chief ministerial candidate lost in election 
On 20 May 1996, the 14 member cabinet of Left Democratic Front led by E. K. Nayanar sworn in. Nayanar was not an elected member of the assembly at that time, and was later elected from Thalassery Constituency.

Results

By-constituency

 Bye Polls in 1996
 Bye Polls in 1998

References

External links 
 Kerala Assembly Election DATABASE

Kerala
State Assembly elections in Kerala
1990s in Kerala
1996 in Indian politics